Marcheston Killett Farm is a historic home and farm located near Clinton, Sampson County, North Carolina.   The house was built about 1865, and is a large one-story, double pile, Greek Revival style frame dwelling sheathed in weatherboard.  It has a cross gable roof, rear ell with a formerly separate log kitchen incorporated, and a dominant front, pedimented, central porch. The interior is center-hall in plan. Also on the property are the contributing sites of demolished outbuildings.

It was added to the National Register of Historic Places in 1986.

References

Farms on the National Register of Historic Places in North Carolina
Greek Revival houses in North Carolina
Houses completed in 1865
Buildings and structures in Sampson County, North Carolina
National Register of Historic Places in Sampson County, North Carolina